Julito Francis (born May 5, 1962) is a fencer from the United States Virgin Islands. He competed in the individual foil event at the 1984 Summer Olympics.

References

External links
 

1962 births
Living people
United States Virgin Islands male foil fencers
Olympic fencers of the United States Virgin Islands
Fencers at the 1984 Summer Olympics